Meridian is a census-designated place (CDP) in Sutter County, California. It is in the Yuba City Metropolitan Statistical Area. The ZIP Code is 95957. The community is inside area code 530. The 2010 United States Census reported Meridian's population was 358.

Geography
According to the United States Census Bureau, the CDP covers an area of 5.3 square miles (13.7 km), all of it land.

Demographics
The 2010 United States Census reported that Meridian had a population of 358. The racial makeup of Meridian was 268 (74.9%) White, 2 (0.6%) African American, 7 (2.0%) Native American, 0 (0.0%) Asian, 0 (0.0%) Pacific Islander, 58 (16.2%) from other races, and 23 (6.4%) from two or more races. Hispanic or Latino of any race were 85 persons (23.7%).

The Census reported that 358 people (100% of the population) lived in households, 0 (0%) lived in non-institutionalized group quarters, and 0 (0%) were institutionalized.

There were 146 households, out of which 42 (28.8%) had children under the age of 18 living in them, 74 (50.7%) were opposite-sex married couples living together, 10 (6.8%) had a female householder with no husband present, 16 (11.0%) had a male householder with no wife present.  There were 11 (7.5%) unmarried opposite-sex partnerships, and 2 (1.4%) same-sex married couples or partnerships. 35 households (24.0%) were made up of individuals, and 17 (11.6%) had someone living alone who was 65 years of age or older. The average household size was 2.45.  There were 100 families (68.5% of all households); the average family size was 2.91.

The population was spread out, with 72 people (20.1%) under the age of 18, 22 people (6.1%) aged 18 to 24, 77 people (21.5%) aged 25 to 44, 132 people (36.9%) aged 45 to 64, and 55 people (15.4%) who were 65 years of age or older.  The median age was 45.7 years. For every 100 females, there were 108.1 males.  For every 100 females age 18 and over, there were 107.2 males.

The homeowner vacancy rate was 2.9%; the rental vacancy rate was 2.1%.  253 people (70.7% of the population) lived in owner-occupied housing units and 105 people (29.3%) lived in rental housing units.

Politics
In the state legislature, Meridian is in the 4th Senate District, represented by Republican Jim Nielsen, and in the 2nd Assembly District, represented by Democrat Jim Wood.

References

Census-designated places in Sutter County, California
Census-designated places in California